Delaware Township is a defunct township that was located in Philadelphia County, Pennsylvania. The borough ceased to exist and was incorporated into the City of Philadelphia following the passage of the Act of Consolidation, 1854.

History

A township formed out of eastern Lower Dublin Township in 1853. Its inhabitants voted at one general election. Its officers were superseded in the next year by consolidation.

Resources
Chronology of the Political Subdivisions of the County of Philadelphia, 1683-1854
Information courtesy of ushistory.org
Incorporated District, Boroughs, and Townships in the County of Philadelphia, 1854 By Rudolph J. Walther - excerpted from the book at the ushistory.org website

Municipalities in Philadelphia County prior to the Act of Consolidation, 1854
Populated places established in 1853
1854 disestablishments in Pennsylvania
1853 establishments in Pennsylvania